Early general elections were held in Belgium on 2 August 1870, the second that year after the partial elections in June had ended with both the Catholic Party and the Liberal Party holding 61 seats each. The result was a victory for the Catholic Party, which won 72 of the 124 seats in the Chamber of Representatives and 34 of the 62 seats in the Senate. Voter turnout was 68%, although only 107,099 people (2.1% of the population) were eligible to vote.

Results

Chamber of Representatives

Senate

See also
Belgium and the Franco-Prussian War

References

1870 2
General
Belgium
Belgium